Kathirmandapam is a 1979 Indian Malayalam film,  directed by K. P. Pillai and produced by HD Combines. The film stars Prem Nazir, Madhu, Jayabharathi and Urvashi in the lead roles. The film has musical score by V. Dakshinamoorthy.

Cast
Prem Nazir
Madhu
Jayabharathi
Urvashi as Child Artist
Adoor Bhasi
Jose Prakash
Sankaradi
Sreelatha Namboothiri
K. P. Ummer
Meena

Soundtrack
The music was composed by V. Dakshinamoorthy and the lyrics were written by Sreekumaran Thampi.

References

External links
 

1979 films
1970s Malayalam-language films